Nymphaeum (Olympia) (Latin), etymologically "home of the Nymphs," or water goddesses, at ancient Olympia was the official name of a water-distribution structure constructed in the mid-2nd century at that site to provide water to the masses who attended the Olympic Games in July and August. Nymphaeum was the general name throughout the Mediterranean for an ornate structure that terminated an aqueduct bringing water from distant elevated terrain, say a stream or copious springs. This one had substructures, statues, and ornately patterned stonework; its main purpose, however, was functional. It received water from the aqueduct into a cistern and released it by stages into a system of open and closed channels leading around the site. The end partaker of the water carried a secular patera, or small drinking bowl, around with him, dipping into an open trough for the water, as is suggested by the fact that at least some of the statues carried such paterae in one hand (They may also have been performing libation). Troughs went everywhere through the site to accommodate the crowds.

The Nymphaeum is a rather late feature at the site. Prior to then the more permanent population of athletes, trainers, and administrators relied on wells or short conduits to the Kladeos River, while the fans suffered greatly, the sources say, with only the water they could carry in. In mid-century the wealthy savant and engineer, friend, teacher, and confidant of the emperors, Herodes Atticus, was invited to attend the games with his wife Regilla, who was made honorary priestess of Demeter to get around the exclusion of females. After experiencing the water deficit first-hand, he promised to construct at his expense ample water facilities by the next Olympiad. He was as good as his word, and so the first-rate water distribution system, which came to be known as "the Nymphaeum of Herodes Atticus", was brought into existence by the best engineers Atticus could obtain. It served as a copious water supply for a number of new baths and the swimming pool of the new grand hotel. More importantly, long troughs brought drinking water along the sides of every playing field for the use of anyone there.

During that Olympiad, Herodes Atticus had constructed more than just the facility, the Nymphaeum. The aqueduct was an essential part of it. The engineering team had to locate a good source of fresh water and build an aqueduct from it, tunneling through the hill. As it turned out, the source was very likely part of the municipal water supply of ancient Pisa. At the other end, the water had to be distributed to the whole site. They decided on open troughs, but they were not continuously open. Hidden pipes went through the walls for transport in places not accessed by the public.

Development of the water problem at Olympia
The Nymphaeum and its entire water supply system are historical developments of Roman Olympia; that is, of the imperial period during which the Romans took a deep interest in the Olympic Games, contributing funds to Olympia, helping to manage the site, competing in its games, and contributing to the new Greco-Roman culture. The floruit of this phase was the 2nd century. The Romans had dominated at Olympia since the late Roman Republic, but with varying policy toward, and varying treatment of it, until, in the time of the "good emperors," they came down solidly in its favor and made some solid contributions.

A closer connection of Olympia to the Romans began when Elis joined the Achaean League after the Second Macedonian War (200-196 BC), during which the League had been an ally of Rome against Macedon. Rome won. In the subsequent Third Macedonian War (171–168 BC) the League chose the wrong side, leading to its punishment in the Achaean War (146 BC). Lucius Mummius Achaicus, Roman commander, sacked Corinth. The Senate subsequently dissolved the League and threw its members into the new province of Macedonia. Olympia was disrespected as the symbol of a subjected enemy. Its moveable wealth was plundered and the statuary was shipped off to Rome.

Finally defeating the last contenders of the long Roman civil war, Octavius Caesar implemented the plan he had made with his adopted father, Julius. The platform had two main planks. First, powerful men were to be suppressed so that they would trouble Rome no more with their bids for power. Second, peace and good government were to be cultivated assiduously (Pax Romana). A new province was created for Greece, Achaea. Changing their policy toward Olympia, the Romans began to invest heavily in its future. The price to the Greeks was that the Romans adopted the place, competing in its games, and being partners in its management.

All throughout the reigns of the Julio-Claudian dynasty and succeeding Flavian Dynasty; that is, the 1st century, Olympia attracted large numbers of contenders and spectators, becoming an international attraction. It expanded to accommodate the traffic. It had been much more condense. Now the stadium was pushed out, the palaistra was moved from the Echo Stoa to its current location, and so on. The water resources were not equal to the population. Both pump-up and gravity-flow facilities provided a minimum of drinkable water. By 1898 the excavators had found nine wells, which required lifting water out. The lines must have been long. Each spectator would have to bring his own jug.

There were a few facilities that received water from the Kladeos by short aqueducts, notably the "Greek baths," an open swimming pool, built over in the Roman period by the Kladeos baths. Under it are the remains of a channel pointed south, presumed to have connected to the pool and the Kladeos lower down. It was presumed supplied by surface channels nearby, but not enough of them remains to trace the connections exactly, and that is true of a more extensive channel system northwest of the Phillipeion; that is, between Kronos and the Kladeos Wall. These channels date from the 5th to the 2nd centuries BC. The location of the future Nymphaeum loomed over these mini-aqueducts totally inaccessible to them. Whether any structures, such as a spring capture, preceded the Nymphaeum is not known. Waste water must have drained to the south toward the confluence of the Kladeos and the Alfeios. The town must have had first options on the Kladeos above Olympia for its municipal water, but that circumstance is not known either.

The flow of the Kladeos was never great. When it rained it grew muddy. The lower Kladeos could not be used, because all rivers next to settlements received the effluent of sewer ditches, mainly latrines. Roman sanitary regulations required a ditch or other channel with water flowing in it. The toilet seats were placed over the ditch, typically in a row, without regard to male or female. If there were any wooden supertructures they did not survive. On the south side, the swifter and more copious Alpheios was of little help because the water, flowing through limestone its whole distance, was too hard (high dissolved carbonates) to drink.

The Romans did not seem able to address the problem, for reasons unknown now. It was probably true that some persons, such as the athletes, trainers and managers, as well as important visitors, had no problem obtaining water. The masses that arrived in July and August, the hottest months of the year, unrelieved by rain, apparently suffered the most. Infectious diseases were rampant, which the citizenry blamed on lack of water (being unfamiliar with microbes). Visiting Olympia could be a hellish experience, yet the fans continued to show up in large numbers. Then in the middle of the 2nd century an unplanned accident led to the reversal of the entire situation.

Herodes Atticus

Herodes Atticus is the popular form of Lucius Vibullius Hipparchus Tiberius Claudius Atticus Herodes, a scion of the noble and prosperous Herodes family at Athens. He was born at Marathon in 101, during the reign of Trajan, second of the five so-called "good emperors."

The Herodes family acquired Roman citizenship with Tiberius Claudius Herodes, son of the archon for 22/3, Eucles. The son was given two historical Roman names. He was placed in the new Roman tribe, Quirina ("citizens," of Rome, of course) under Nero. Great-grandfather of Herodes Atticus, his son was Tiberius Claudius Hipparchus, and his, Claudius Atticus Herodes, a wealthy financier. Hipparchus was accused groundlessly by Domitian of sedition. His property was confiscated and sold, and he was probably executed, another move to acquire funds by an unscrupulous Roman emperor following the Julio-Claudian precedent.

On the day Domitian was killed the Senate appointed Nerva as emperor. He would become the first of the Nerva-Antonine dynasty (the "good emperors"). A veteran consular officer, he lacked nothing in experience. He had been trusted by Domitian, apparently unaware of his true views. On accession he vowed to restore civil liberties. His reforms amounted to a sweeping program of beneficence. He reigned for fifteen months before dying from complications of a stroke. At the insistence of the police he had adopted a popular young man who shared his ideals, Trajan.

Under Nerva the Herodes family flourished, adopting wholeheartedly the new charitable platform. The turning point was the discovery by Herodes Atticus' father of a fortune, probably coin and bar, ensconced in a house of his (he had been allowed to retain property in his name). There are no reports that he had prior knowledge of it. Under Domitian the discovery would have been a death warrant for the assumed concealment of assets from the emperor. Duly notified, and offered the money, Nerva told him to keep it. Marrying an heiress shortly after, Atticus père became famously wealthy. For his subsequent generosity in funding the government and public activities Nerva awarded him the ornamenta praetoria ("police medal") and admitted him to the Roman Senate.

The gravity flow system of Herodes Atticus

Engineering principles

The ancients had many methods of obtaining water from a source, all either pump-up or gravity flow. The simplest pump-up was a woman filling and carrying a water vessel to the location of use. If the source was not a surface one they dug for it, as at Mycenae, where a tunnel led down to a spring. Potential energy is added in pump-up, not necessarily by humans, but also by animals and mechanical devices.

In gravity flow the water loses potential energy. The water must always be kept moving downhill. Rain capture is one such system, in which rain falling on a roof or terrace drains into a gutter and exits the latter from a spout. So many lion's head spouts were found at Olympia that all the larger buildings must have had them. The method is not effective if it never rains. A second method is spring capture, in which a spring empties into a collection basin and is piped or channeled from there, such as Delphi had. There was, however, no Mount Parnassus at Olympia.

None of these methods being effective for municipal water, the Romans became adept at stream capture. The sites for military camps were chosen at locations where a stream would run through the camp, usually half-way up a hill. Larger settlements tapped streams from elevated terrain many miles away. They built chutes, or aqueducts that descended at a low gradient crossing valleys on bridges and going through hills in tunnels. The key engineering principle was that the downward slope must be kept over the entire length. At the terminus was an elaborate distribution structure, called in the 2nd century a nymphaeum, "home of the nymphs," or water goddesses, a patent conceit.

It is in the building of these systems that Herodes Atticus had become in essence a civil engineer with expertise in water supply. It was the duty of wealthy men to manage projects such as these, as it had been under the Republic, at their own expense, or assisted by empire funds, although they could levy taxes to cover it (not a popular method). Prominent men who refused the duty found themselves in public odium, or worse, imperial odium.

The Nymphaeum at Olympia was excavated 1877–1878 and was duly published in 1892. The initial excavators believed they had found a spring capture, which they called "the exedra" (ex-hedra for *ex-sedra, "sitting room") in the sense of "spring-house." The name stuck for decades. They saw it as a kind of grotto carved into the hill from which a spring was presumed to have flowed.

The aqueduct
Some troubling questions remained. If that much water was flowing from the hill, why was it not still flowing? Moreover, there were no seats, and the site was too elevated for easy access. Soon they discovered a large cistern at the back of the main wall fed by a brick tunnel going eastward through the base of the hill along "treasury terrace" and then turning into the hill. The tunnel is mounted atop a buttressed wall for stability and elevation control. Whether it was visible in ancient times is unknown. The 20-foot difference gave plenty of momentum to the flow, which must have come jetting impressively out the spouts of the Nymphaeum.

The hill above the wall has since been sacrificed to the road, which passes through a cut. The cut has obviously removed any subterranean phases of the aqueduct leading into the hill. At the time of the cut it is not certain the excavators knew the aqueduct came out of the hill. A French map of 1878 and a Russian map of 1885 show the aqueduct on the terrace but no road. Dörpfeld's map of 1887 shows it with worksheds along it (long since disappeared). The date of the road is therefore most likely 1886 (given accurate maps). Adler's impossible comment about the probable source suggests the issue had not been investigated and decided.

Adler believed the source was the upper Kladeos "in the southwestern spur of Erymanthus Mountain." The terrain map shows Erymanthos as a massif in the vicinity of Pothos ( and Lalas, with a long ridge extending to the SW, of which Kronion is the very last hill. The Kladeos begins in the vicinilty of the village of Kladeos to the north of the spur; however, it is far too northward to be Adler's 1 km from Olympia.

The 1 km only gets you upriver as far as the north of the village of Archaia Olympia. Adler apparently based the number on elevation. The 50m elevation of the river at that point matches the 50m elevation of the top of the Nymphaeum. As one cannot assume that the established archaeologist was unfamiliar with either hydrology or terrain maps, an explanation might be sought in the original date of his comment, which was perhaps before discovery and excavation of the remaining aqueduct. The high end of the aqueduct at about 55m is matched by the elevation of the river at Koskinas 2km north of Olympia. If the water did come from a tunnel through the hill, the terrain on the other side is at about 60m, but the cave in the road cut is about 70m. An aqueduct of 74 m on the north side of the spur would have to reach the sources of the Kladeos in Erymanthos, near Mageiras at 3.5 km from Olympia.

There are, however, good reasons for thinking the engineers did not run the aqueduct to the north of the spur. If the existing sources from the middle Kladeos were not adequate, then the different branches of the upper Kladeos, each containing less water, would not be either. Since the climate is about the same as it was, and the geology has not changed much, the ancient water was probably most copious where the modern water is, in the higher mountains to the east, the sources of the municipal water supplies there.

The surviving aqueduct enters from the east, not the west, placing it on the southeastern face of the ridge. The only other remnant was a projection above Earth on a hilltop in the village of Miraka, now in downtown Pisa, Greece, reported about the time of the excavation of Olympia. The projection was presumably removed during urban renewal. The population used them for discharge of waste water, which descended to the Alpheios.

The average precipitation in Greece today is roughly 600 mm per year in the plains and 2000 plus mm per year in the mountains. The imbalance was probably not much different in classical times; i.e., the water was to be found in the mountains, which is where Herodes Atticus' engineers would have looked for it, in the "hills of Linaria and Muria." They may have looked, but they probably didn't find it there. Ephemeral rivers extend north to the required elevations, but being ephemeral they transported only waste water, not drinking water.

The mountain stream descends as a pebble-bottom ditch choked with vegetation from springs and waterfalls of the upper col until it reaches Tripotama as a goo0d-sized, fast-flowing shallow river. There it enters Erymanthos gorge. There are no tracks along its whitewater extent through there until it reaches Haratsariou gorge, where there is a road crossing over an iron bridge, the Nemouta bridge. Southward from there a difficult hiking trail crosses the mouths of two ravines conducting additional water through a cascading region known as Nemouta Falls, some 30 waterfalls draining a wider region, which enhance the flow below.

Further up the Alfeios is another tributary, the Ladon, of similar flow. The lake is far to the north, but at lower elevations the Erymanthos rises faster than the Ladon by about 20m, which excludes the Ladon from being the source of the aqueduct at Miraka. The Erymanthos, then, is the best logical choice for the source of the aqueduct according to the circumstantial evidence, which is not surprising. Starting in 2013, a new water treatment plant on the Elis side of the middle Erymanthos river began delivering (via gravity-flow underground channels) a fixed rate of 0.6 cubic meters per second  of drinking water ("Domestic Water Supply") on a fixed monthly schedule to all the communities downstream in the Alfeios system as far as Pyrgos; i.e., all north and central Elis. Hydroelectric and irrigational water is taken from different streams on an optimal allocation basis. Evidently, the value of the Erymanthos for municipal supplies has long been known and appreciated.

All the hydrologic circumstances together offer a credible view of Herodes Atticus' engineering plan and account for its success, although little of it can as yet be proved by regional archaeology. Before Herodes, the Olympia park depended on wells, rainfall, and the Olympia municipal water system; i.e., the Kladeos, for its water supplies, which became less adequate as the whole system was taxed by population growth and Roman internationalism. Herodes broke the park loose from the Olympia system and brought in water from the Pisa municipal system, which was probably already tapping the Erymanthos, as there was plenty of water for all, which can't be sourced to the Pisa region.

Notes

Citations

Reference bibliography

 
  Contains a chapter on the Altis during the Roman period.

External links

Olympia, Greece
Ancient Olympia
Fountains
Nymphs